is a Japanese action anime television series produced by GoHands with collaboration of production company Frontier Works and publisher Kadokawa. It aired from January 10 to March 28, 2017.

A sequel named W'z, which is set a decade after the events of Hand Shakers, premiered on January 5, 2019.

Plot
Hand Shakers takes place in Osaka in "AD20XX". The story revolves around Tazuna Takatsuki, a high-school student with a knack for mechanics, who accepts a certain repair request and visits a university research facility. There, he meets Koyori Akutagawa, a lone girl asleep on a bed. As though being led by something, Tazuna touches her fingertips—and a voice flows into him from a place unknown. Tazuna is left bewildered as a new world, Ziggurat, lies before him. Now together as Hand Shakers, the duo must fight to earn the right to confront God, where they will be able to make a wish. With "Nimrods", powers born from one's psyche after holding hands, the many groups of Hand Shakers must battle to defeat God.

Characters

Hand Shakers

Team Gear
 / 

A kind high-school student who is especially good at mechanics and is always running around doing repairs for other people. He is more focused than the average person, but worries about the fact that this makes him unaware of his surroundings. He became a Hand Shaker after holding hands with Koyori while she was sleeping in a laboratory. Koyori, who will die if he lets go of her hand, reminds him of his younger sister who died. This motivates him to protect her as Koyori does not have a Nimrod to fight by herself. Chizuru later gives him the code name of "Single Gear". In W'z, Tazuna currently travels around the world in order to look for clues about the whereabouts of Koyori's twin, Mayumi, and her partner, Nagaoka.

 / 

A white-haired girl who is Tazuna's partner. Before meeting him, she had been put to sleep to conserve her life force, but after having her hand held by Tazuna she woke up and they became Hand Shaker partners. She reminds Tazuna of his younger sister and even though is expressionless and does not speak, she is extremely compassionate and cares very deeply about Tazuna. Koyori receives the code name "Sprocket Gear" from Hibiki after successfully activating her Nimrod. The 13th episode reveals that she only survived her coma because Musubu, Tazuna's younger sister, had previously authorized the donation of her organs before her death. In W'z, Koyori works as a researcher at Kita Asuka Academy. She hoped to find her older twin sister, Mayumi, together with her partner, Nagaoka. Unfortunately, she was no longer able to use her Nimrods.

Team Card
 / 

The student council president at Tazuna's school and a highly respected honor student. She often asks Tazuna for help with repairs and is secretly a Hand Shaker, with her own younger brother as her partner. She has a talent for tarot card reading and, using this skill, she often advises those around her. Due to her parents' constant quarrels, Riri turns overprotective towards her younger brother. She also loves him dearly. By meeting 'God', Riri hopes to live in a world where both her and Masaru will be able to live together in peace. After being defeated by Tazuna & Koyori, Riri returns home and was informed of the news of her parents' divorce. In W'z, Riri is a fine grown woman. Since Masaru was adopted, He and Lily have since become married. 

 / 

A mature and calm twelve-year-old boy with a talent for card games. Although he is younger, he always tries to look after his older sister. He is also known to be the number one card player in the district. Due to his parents' constant quarrels, Masaru was often scolded by his mother. He also performed poorly at school making his father to not pay attention to him. He worries about Riri's condition as she was being overprotective of him, willing to take the blame of his mistakes from their mother. After being defeated by Tazuna & Koyori, Masaru returns home and was informed by the news of his parents' divorce. In W'z, Masaru is a grown man. He is Reijiro's acquaintance. He approached Yukiya and tells him to meet with Dr. Akutagawa from Kita Asuka Academy. Masaru still keeps his close relationship with his older sister, Riri.

Team Shadow
 / 

A short and cheerful young woman who is the boss of a company called Centeolt. Despite her looks, she is a very capable and hardworking boss. She often makes witty comebacks to her subordinate, Hayate. She is defeated by Team Gear and offers to guide them around the world of Ziggurat. In W'z, Chizuru and Hayate managed a quiescent café together.

 / 

Chizuru's subordinate and a new employee. While tall and erect, he is extremely easygoing and always apologises. Due to his height, he is often mistaken to be Chizuru's boss, which annoys her to no end. He is defeated by Team Gear and goes with Chizuru's idea of guiding Koyori and Tazuna around the world of Ziggurat. In W'z, Hayate managed a quiescent café together with his former boss, Chizuru.

Team Sword
 / 

An idol recognised by her use of proverbs and prominent pigtails. Cheerful and self-assured, she is very confident in her abilities and partners with Hibiki. Despite her full confidence, Kodama is an unsuccessful idol. She was under-promoted by her agency making her obscure by the public. Her only wish is to be a successful idol who was adored by her fans. After being defeated by Tazuna & Koyori, Kodama felt dejected and almost on the verge of giving up her dreams as an idol. Hibiki managed to encourage her and lift her spirits to try once again. Determined, Kodama once again raise and took baby-steps to be a successful & well-known idol. In W'z, Kodama is a Proprietress. Due to her schedule, she was unable to attend the Hand Shakers gathering that Masaru planned.

 / 

A Hand Shaker that fights alongside Kodama. He was a businessman until he left his job in order to support Kodama, and now works as her manager. He is always deeply moved by everything Kodama says or does and is quick to compliment her. His enthusiasm and fondness of Kodama was due to her obscurity. Hibiki quits his former job to be Kodama's manager. He is committed with his management work, aiming to grant Kodama's wishes to be a famous idol. After being defeated by Tazuna & Koyori, Hibiki encouraged Kodama to take another chance as an idol, which in turn lifts up Kodama's spirits. He gave Koyori the code name, "Sprocket Gear" after she activated her Nimrod. In W'z, Hibiki is a busy Tailor who works with Kodama. Due to their schedule, he was unable to attend the Hand Shakers gathering.

Team Cocoon
 / 

 Nagaoka is old associate and the former Hand Shakers partner of Makihara. Together with Makihara, he works under the Akutagawa's in order to understand the nature of the Babel lore & Ziggurat. After the birth of the Akutagawa sisters, Nagaoka & Makihara become their caretakers, having to constantly activate their Nimrods to protect the twins from other Hand Shakers. After the disappearance of Mr. & Mrs. Akutagawa, and the sudden insensated condition of the twins, Nagaoka aims to continue on the Akutagawa's research to end the suffering of the twin sisters. He took Mayumi away and drugged her to keep her alive. After being defeated by Tazuna & Koyori, Mayumi reveals that Nagaoka was physically suffering from health issues and the reason he was acting so brash was due to his goal of reaching 'God' before his sickness took over him. Despite taking a shrewd measure to keep her alive, Nagaoka actually cares for Mayumi. His code name is "Golden Cocoon". In W'z, Nagaoka and Mayumi, together with Tazuna and Koyori managed to reach 'God'. After that very meeting, both Nagaoka & Mayumi's whereabouts were unknown.

 / 

 Mayumi is Koyori's older twin sister and former Hand Shakers partner, as well as Nagaoka's partner. Together with Koyori, she was born inside of the Ziggurat dimension, thus was considered special. This however, attracts the attention of other groups of Hand Shakers with ill intentions. After the betrayal of Shigure, a dejected Mayumi wished that she and her sister won't need to fight anymore. She and Koyori suddenly go into comas after the disappearance of their parents. Nagaoka then took her and keeps her alive by using a questionable method. In spite of this, Mayumi was thankful with Nagaoka for his attempts, understanding his urgency to continue her parents' legacy. After their defeat, Mayumi stays with Nagaoka and tries to help him with his goals. Her code name is "Silver Cocoon". In W'z, Mayumi & Nagaoka, altogether with Tazuna & Koyori managed to reach 'God'. After the very meeting, both Mayumi & Nagaoka went missing.

Team Chain

A ruthless Hand Shaker who is Bind's partner. He accesses Bind's chain-making ability by torturing her. After being defeated by Tazuna and Koyori, he and Bind begin to mend their relationship. In W'z, Break, also known as Reijiro, becomes the adoptive parents of the series's protagonist. He is now married with his partner Bind.

A young woman that fights alongside Break. Despite being cruelly treated, she is very dependent on Break and cares for him and even states that she will do anything for him. After being defeated by Tazuna and Koyori, she and Break begin to mend their relationship. In W'z, Bind, also known as Yukine, is the adoptive mother of the series's protagonist. She is now married with her partner Break.

Others
 / 

A professor at a university who actually researching the truth behind Hand Shakers. To put Koyori on safety, he has been putting her on sleep before meeting Tazuna.

 / 

Tazuna's deceased younger sister who died from an illness. Before her death, she allowed the donation of her organs, leading to Koyori and Mayumi's miraculous survival.

Tazuna's father.

Tazuna's mother. Often seen being lovey dovey with her husband.

 / 

 / 

Makihira and Nagaoka's junior researcher who used to work with them in researching Hand Shakers. She is later revealed to be working alongside another Hand Shaker called Koichi in order to defeat their rivals, betraying Makihara and Nagaoka. However, Makihara and Nagaoka defeat them and force them to flee.

Mayumi and Koyori's Father.

Mayumi and Koyori's Mother.

Koichi

 A Hand Shaker who helps Shigure in ambushing and betraying other Hand Shakers. After being defeated, he is forced to flee.

Media

Anime
The project was announced in March 2016, but the project site was relaunched in July 2016. Kadokawa and GOON TRAX produced the music for the anime. The opening theme song, titled "One Hand Message", is performed by OxT, while the ending theme, titled "Yume Miru Ame", is performed by Akino Arai. The anime was celebrating the 30th anniversary of the Animate chain of anime character goods stores. The anime ran for 12 episodes. An unaired episode was released on July 26, 2017, titled Hand Shakers EX. Crunchyroll has licensed the series in North America. Muse Communication licensed the series in Southeast Asia and South Asia, and aired it on Animax Asia and later on its own Muse Asia YouTube channel.

Note

References

External links
 

2017 anime television series debuts
Action anime and manga
Anime with original screenplays
Child superheroes
Crunchyroll anime
Fiction about death games
Funimation
GoHands
Mainichi Broadcasting System original programming
Muse Communication
Osaka in fiction
Science fiction anime and manga
Television shows about psychic powers
Television shows set in Osaka
Tokyo MX original programming